George Little may refer to:

Politics and government
 George E. Little, Pentagon/Department of Defense press secretary
 George Little (Manitoba politician) (died 1940), Manitoba MLA
 George Little (naval officer) (1754–1809), American naval officer during the Revolutionary War
 George Little (New Brunswick politician) (1937–2021), leader of the New Democratic Party of New Brunswick
 George Little (North Carolina politician) (born 1942), Republican politician from North Carolina
 George W. Little, New York politician

Sports
George Little (American football coach) (1889–1957), American football and basketball coach, 1914–1926
George Little (defensive lineman) (born 1963), American football player
George Little (footballer) (1915–2002), English professional footballer
Dan McLeod (wrestler) (1860–1958), Scottish wrestler, born George Little

Entertainment
George Little (character), older brother of film character Stuart Little
George L. Little (c. 1950–2014), American costume designer
George Little (actor) (1928–2022), English television actor, father of Tasmin Little